Nikola Sarić may refer to:

 Nikola Sarić (footballer) (born 1991), Danish footballer
 Nikola Sarić (singer) (born 1989), Serbian singer, musician and television personality
 Nikola Sarić (painter) (born 1985), German artist
Matronymic surnames
Serbian surnames